Sir William Paterson (April 1658 - 22 January 1719) was a Scottish trader and banker. He was one of the founders of the Bank of England and was one of the main proponents of the catastrophic Darien scheme. Later he became an advocate of Union with England.

Biography

Early life 
William Paterson was born in his parents' farmhouse at Tinwald in Dumfriesshire, Scotland, and lived with them until he was seventeen, when he emigrated first (briefly) to Bristol and then to the Bahamas, although accounts differ as to the duration of his stays. During his time in the West Indies he first conceived the idea of the Darién scheme, his plan to create a colony on the isthmus of Panama, facilitating trade with the Far East. While in the West Indies, it is said that he acted as a merchant, developing a reputation for business acumen and dealings with local buccaneers.

Career 

Paterson returned to Europe by the middle of the 1680s, and attempted to convince the English government under James II to undertake the Darién scheme. When they refused, he tried again to persuade the governments of the Holy Roman Empire and the Dutch Republic to establish a colony in Panama, but failed in both cases.

Paterson then went to London in 1687 and made his fortune with foreign trade (primarily through the slave trade with the West Indies) in the Merchant Taylors' Company. He also helped to found a company for supplying water to North London from the Hampstead Hills, known as the Hampstead Water Company which existed until the late 19th century.

In 1694, he co-founded the Bank of England. It was said that the project originated with him in 1691, as described in his pamphlet A Brief Account of the Intended Bank of England, to act as the English government's banker. He proposed a loan of £1.2m to the government; in return the subscribers would be incorporated as The Governor and Company of the Bank of England with banking privileges including the issue of notes. The Royal Charter was granted on 27 July 1694. On the foundation of the bank in 1694 he became a director. In 1695, owing to a disagreement with his colleagues, he withdrew from the board and devoted himself to the colony of Darien, unsuccessfully planted in 1698.

Darien scheme

Paterson relocated to Edinburgh, where he was able to convince the Scottish government to undertake the Darién scheme, a failed attempt to found an independent Scottish Empire in what is today Panama. Paterson personally accompanied the disastrous Scottish expedition to Panama in 1698, where his wife and child died while he himself became seriously ill. On his return to Scotland in December 1699, he became instrumental in the movement for the Union of Scotland and England, culminating in his support of the Act of Union 1707. He spent the last years of his life in Westminster, and died in January 1719.  A mystery still surrounds the burial site of Paterson.  Many (including officials at the Bank of England), believe he is buried in Sweetheart Abbey, New Abbey, Dumfries and Galloway.

Publications
 Proposals and Reasons for Constitulating a Council of Trade (1701), a plan to create a Scottish council of Trade which would stimulate the Scottish economy and trade, partly by abolishing export duties. 
 A Proposal to plant a Colony in Darién to protect the Indians against Spain, and to open the Trade of South America to all Nations (1701), a broader version of the Darién scheme intended to bring free trade to all of Central and South America. 
 Wednesday Club Dialogues upon the Union (1706), a series of imaginary dialogues in which Paterson expressed his beliefs that Scotland had to be guaranteed equal taxation, freedom of trade and proportionate representation in Parliament if union with England was to succeed.

See also 
 Acts of Union 1707
 Saxe Bannister
 Daniel Defoe, writer and novelist 
 John Holland, founder of the Bank of Scotland
 Lionel Wafer, a buccaneer who had been marooned for four years on the isthmus of Darién, whom Paterson hired as an adviser for the Darién Scheme.

References

External links

Famous Scots - William Paterson
The Darien Venture, Dr Mike Ibeji (BBC)

1658 births
1719 deaths
People from Dumfries and Galloway
Scottish bankers
Scottish economists
People associated with the Bank of England
West Indies merchants
17th-century Scottish businesspeople
Cloth merchants
18th-century Scottish businesspeople
Burials at Sweetheart Abbey